Lyubov Vladimirovna Sokolova ( (Шашко́ва), also known as Lyubov Kılıç and formerly known as Lyubov Shashkova, born 4 December 1977) is a retired Russian volleyball player. She was a member of the national team that won the gold medals at 2006 and 2010 World Championship in Japan and the silver medals at the 2000 Summer Olympics in Sydney and the 2004 Summer Olympics in Athens.

Personal life
She married Turkish former volleyball player Aytaç Kılıç when she was playing for Eczacıbaşı Istanbul. She has a son from her ex-husband. She has Turkish as well as Russian citizenship.

Career
Sokolova has numerous individual awards in all categories. In 2006, she was honored "Best player of Europe".

She won the 2006–07 CEV Top Teams Cup with the Spanish team Grupo 2002 Murcia, and was awarded "Most Valuable Player" and "Best Server".

Sokolova won the bronze medal at the 2010–11 CEV Champions League with Fenerbahçe.

In May 2016, Sokolova announced her retirement from sports.

Clubs
  CSKA Moscow (1992–1995)
  Rossy Moscow (1995–1996)
  Mladost Zagabria (1997–1998)
  Hitachi (1998–1999)
  Uralotchka NTMK Ekaterinburg (1999–2000)
  Eczacıbaşı (2000–2001)
  Radio 105 Foppapedretti Bergamo (2002–2005)
  Monte Schiavo Banca Marche Jesi (2005–2006)
  Grupo 2002 Murcia (2006–2007)
  Zarechie Odintsovo (2007–2009)
  Monte Schiavo Banca Marche Jesi (2009–2010)
  Fenerbahçe (2010–2012)
  Eczacıbaşı (2012–2013)
  Dinamo Krasnodar (2013–2016, 2017–2018)

Awards

Individuals
 1999 FIVB World Grand Prix "Best Server"
 1999 FIVB World Cup "Best Spiker"
 1999 FIVB World Cup "Best Receiver"
 2001 European Volleyball Championship "Best Server"
 2001 European Volleyball Championship "Best Receiver"
 2004 Cev Challenge Cup "Best server"
 2004 Cev Challenge Cup "Most Valuable Player"
 2005 European Champions League "Most valuable player"
 2005 European Champions League "Best Spiker"
 2006 CEV "Best player of European"
 2007 European Championship "Best Receiver"
 2006–07 Top Teams Cup "Most Valuable Player"
 2006–07 Top Teams Cup "Best Server"
 2011 Aroma League Women's Championship "Most Valuable Player"

Clubs
 2001 Turkish Cup –  Champion, with Eczacibasi Istanbul
 2001 Turkish Championship –  Champion, with Eczacibasi Istanbul
 2003–04 CEV Challenge Cup –  Champion, with Radio 105 Foppapedretti Bergamo
 2004 Italian Championship –  Champion, with Radio 105 Foppapedretti Bergamo
 2004 Italian Super Cup –  Champion, with Radio 105 Foppapedretti Bergamo
 2004–05 CEV Champions League –  Champion, with Radio 105 Foppapedretti Bergamo
 2006 Spanish Super Cup –  Champion, with Grupo 2002 Murcia
 2007 Spanish Queen Cup –  Champion, with Grupo 2002 Murcia
 2007 Spanish Championship –  Champion, with Grupo 2002 Murcia
 2007 CEV Top Teams Cup –  Champion, with Grupo 2002 Murcia
 2008 Russian Championship –  Champion, with Zarechie Odintsovo
 2008 Russian Cup –  Champion, with Zarechie Odintsovo
 2010 Turkish Super Cup –  Champion, with Fenerbahçe
 2010 FIVB World Club Championship –  Champion, with Fenerbahçe
 2010–11 CEV Champions League –  Bronze medal, with Fenerbahçe
 2010–11 Aroma Women's Volleyball League –  Champion, with Fenerbahçe
 2011–12 CEV Champions League –  Champion, with Fenerbahçe Universal
 2012 Turkish Volleyball Super Cup –  Champion, with Eczacıbaşı VitrA
 2012-2013 Turkish Women's Volleyball Cup –  Runner-Up, with Eczacıbaşı VitrA
 2012-2013 Turkish Women's Volleyball League –  Runner-Up, with Eczacıbaşı VitrA
 2014–2015 CEV Cup –  Champion, with Dinamo Krasnodar
 2015 Clubs World Championship –  Runner-Up, with Dinamo Krasnodar
 2015–2016 CEV Cup –  Champion, with Dinamo Krasnodar

References

External links
 
 FIVB Profile
 CEV Profile
 

1977 births
Living people
Russian women's volleyball players
Turkish women's volleyball players
Russian emigrants to Turkey
Turkish expatriate sportspeople in Spain
Turkish people of Russian descent
Naturalized citizens of Turkey
Eczacıbaşı volleyball players
Fenerbahçe volleyballers
Olympic volleyball players of Russia
Volleyball players at the 1996 Summer Olympics
Volleyball players at the 2000 Summer Olympics
Volleyball players at the 2004 Summer Olympics
Volleyball players at the 2008 Summer Olympics
Volleyball players at the 2012 Summer Olympics
Olympic silver medalists for Russia
Olympic medalists in volleyball
Russian expatriate sportspeople in Turkey
Russian expatriate sportspeople in Spain
Expatriate volleyball players in Spain
Sportspeople from Moscow
Medalists at the 2004 Summer Olympics
Medalists at the 2000 Summer Olympics